The Legislature of Alberta is the unicameral legislature of the province of Alberta, Canada. The legislature is made of two elements: the lieutenant governor of Alberta, and the Legislative Assembly of Alberta. The legislature has existed since Alberta was formed out of part of the North-West Territories in 1905.

Like the Canadian federal government, Alberta uses a Westminster-style parliamentary government, in which members are sent to the Legislative Assembly after general elections and the lieutenant governor appoints the person who can command a majority of the members of the Assembly, typically the leader of the party with the most seats, as Premier of Alberta. The premier then recommends the appointment of the Executive Council of Alberta. The premier is Alberta's head of government, while the King of Canada is its head of state.

List of legislatures
Following is a list of the times the legislature has been convened since 1905. For previous legislatures, see List of Northwest Territories Legislative Assemblies.
1st Alberta Legislature: 1905–1909
2nd Alberta Legislature: 1909–1913
3rd Alberta Legislature: 1913–1917
4th Alberta Legislature: 1917–1921
5th Alberta Legislature: 1921–1926
6th Alberta Legislature: 1926–1930
7th Alberta Legislature: 1930–1935
8th Alberta Legislature: 1935–1940
9th Alberta Legislature: 1940–1944
10th Alberta Legislature: 1944–1948
11th Alberta Legislature: 1948–1952
12th Alberta Legislature: 1952–1955
13th Alberta Legislature: 1955–1959
14th Alberta Legislature: 1959–1963
15th Alberta Legislature: 1963–1967
16th Alberta Legislature: 1967–1971
17th Alberta Legislature: 1971–1975
18th Alberta Legislature: 1975–1979
19th Alberta Legislature: 1979–1982
20th Alberta Legislature: 1982–1986
21st Alberta Legislature: 1986–1989
22nd Alberta Legislature: 1989–1993
23rd Alberta Legislature: 1993–1997
24th Alberta Legislature: 1997–2001
25th Alberta Legislature: 2001–2004
26th Alberta Legislature: 2004–2008
27th Alberta Legislature: 2008–2012
28th Alberta Legislature: 2012–2015
29th Alberta Legislature: 2015–2019
30th Alberta Legislature: 2019–present

References

External links
Alberta Legislative Assembly official YouTube 
Alberta Legislative Assembly
Alberta Legislative Assembly official Facebook page

 
Legislative Assemblies